Expedition 31 was the 31st long-duration expedition to the International Space Station (ISS). It began on 27 April 2012 with the departure from the ISS of the Soyuz TMA-22 spacecraft, which returned the Expedition 30 crew to Earth. The expedition ended on 1 July 2012, when crew members Oleg Kononenko, André Kuipers and Don Pettit departed from the ISS aboard Soyuz TMA-03M, marking the beginning of Expedition 32.

Crew

Source NASA

Mission highlights

Soyuz TMA-22 departure
Expedition 31 formally began on 27 April 2012, with the departure from the ISS of the Soyuz TMA-22 spacecraft. Soyuz TMA-22 successfully returned Expedition 30 astronauts Dan Burbank, Anton Shkaplerov and Anatoli Ivanishin to Earth. The ISS was left under the command of astronauts Kononenko, Kuipers and Pettit, who had arrived at the station aboard Soyuz TMA-03M on 23 December 2011.

Soyuz TMA-04M arrival

The final three members of Expedition 31 – Acaba, Padalka and Revin – arrived at the ISS aboard Soyuz TMA-04M, which launched on 15 May 2012, and docked to the ISS on 17 May at 4:36 UTC.

SpaceX Dragon test mission
SpaceX's unmanned Dragon spacecraft conducted a test rendezvous with the ISS during Expedition 31, as part of NASA's Commercial Orbital Transportation Services program; it was the first commercial spacecraft to rendezvous with the ISS. Following a series of delays, Dragon launched on 22 May 2012, and berthed successfully with the ISS on 25 May, after conducting a series of orbital test manoeuvres. Dragon landed intact in the Pacific Ocean and was successfully recovered, allowing SpaceX to begin regular cargo flights to the ISS. The first such logistics mission, CRS SpX-1, launched successfully in October 2012.

Soyuz TMA-03M departure
Soyuz TMA-03M departed from the ISS on 1 July 2012, successfully returning Kononenko, Kuipers and Pettit to Earth. Their departure marked the formal end of Expedition 31, and the beginning of Expedition 32.

In popular culture
In the 2012 The Big Bang Theory episode "The Friendship Contraction", character Howard Wolowitz revealed that he would be a member of a fictionalized Expedition 31.

Gallery

References

External links

NASA's Space Station Expeditions page
End of Expedition 30/Beginning of Expedition 31 video
Expedition 30/31 - Change of Command Ceremony video
End of Expedition 31/Beginning of Expedition 32 video
Expedition 31/32 - Change of Command Ceremony video
Expedition 31 Photography 

Expeditions to the International Space Station
2012 in spaceflight